The 9th constituency of Budapest is one of the single member constituencies of the National Assembly, the national legislature of Hungary. The constituency standard abbreviation: Budapest 09. OEVK.

Since 2014, it has been represented by Sándor Burány of the MSZP-Dialogue party alliance.

Geography
The 9th constituency is located in central part of Pest.

The constituency borders with 8th- and 13th constituency to the north, 14th- and 15th constituency to the east, 16th constituency to the south, 6th constituency to the south and west.

List of districts
The constituency includes the following municipalities:

 District X.: Main part of the district (except Újhegy and Keresztúridűlő).
 District XIX.: Northeastern part of the district (east of the Ady Endre út).

History
The 9th constituency of Budapest was created in 2011 and contained of the pre-2011 abolished constituencies of the part of 14th, 26th and 28th constituency of the capital. Its borders have not changed since its creation.

Members
The constituency was first represented by Sándor Burány of MSZP (with Unity support) from 2014, and he was re-elected of Dialogue in 2018.

Election result

2022 election

2018 election

2014 election

Notes

References

Budapest 9th